is a railway station on the Jōetsu Line in Uonuma, Niigata, Japan, operated by the East Japan Railway Company (JR East).

Lines

Station layout
The station has two single ground-level opposed side platforms serving two tracks, connected by a level crossing. The station is unattended.

Platforms

History
Kita-Horinouchi Station opened on 15 February 1950. Upon the privatization of the Japanese National Railways (JNR) on 1 April 1987, it came under the control of JR East.

Surrounding area
Japan National Route 17

See also
 List of railway stations in Japan

External links
 Kita-Horinouchi Station information (JR East) 

Railway stations in Niigata Prefecture
Railway stations in Japan opened in 1950
Stations of East Japan Railway Company
Jōetsu Line